Aiqyn Oiratuly Qongyrov (born 28 November 1972) is a Kazakh politician who is serving as a member of the Mazhilis since 2012. He was the chairman of the People's Party of Kazakhstan (QHP) from 11 November 2020 before being succeeded by Ermūhamet Ertısbaev on 27 March 2022 and was the party's secretary from 2013 to 2020. He is currently a parliamentary leader of QHP in the Mazhilis from 17 September 2018.

Biography

Early life and career 
Qongyrov was born in the village of Kuibyshevsky in the Kokshetau Region. After graduating from high school in 1989, he joined worked as a locksmith at the motor depot of the Kuybyshevsky District Agricultural Administration. In 1997, Qongyrov graduated from Kokshetau State University and eventually attended the Themis Law Academy of Karaganda, where he received a law degree in 2005. 

From 2004 to 2011, Qongyrov was actively engaged in entrepreneurial activities and led the News Print LLP, which was responsible for the publication of the Moscow Komsomolets in Kazakh newspapers.

Political career 
In 2004, Qongyrov became a member of the Organizing Committee for the establishment of the Communist People's Party of Kazakhstan (QKHP) and the moment of the party's registration, he headed the apparatus of the Central Committee until 2012. During his tenure, in 2005–2006, Qongyrov worked in Almaty as the second secretary of the city committee of Almaty and then became a member of the bureau of the QKHP Central Committee in 2008.

In the 2004 and 2007 legislative elections, Qongyrov was amongst people that ran for MP from the QKHP for the lower house Mazhilis, though the party failed to win any seats during its early years. It wasn't until in 2012, as the QKHP managed to bypass the needed electoral threshold to enter the parliament resulted in Qongyrov being elected as a lawmaker. During his first term in office, he served as a member of the Mazhilis Committee on Agricultural Issues.

On 17 September 2018, Qongyrov became the parliamentary leader of the People's Communist Party, succeeding Vladislav Kosarev. 

In April 2019, Qongyrov stated that he considered running for president in the 2019 Kazakh presidential election, however, the QKHP chose Jambyl Ahmetbekov who had previously ran in 2011 to be the candidate.

On 11 November 2020, the QKHP changed its name to the People's Party of Kazakhstan. From there, Qongyrov was unanimously elected as the party's chairman at its 15th Extraordinary Congress.

Controversies 
Qongyrov in 2014 during an interview with Vlast.kz insisted that the Kazakh government wouldn't allow gay parades nor legalise same-sex marriage to influence the decision by the International Olympic Committee (IOC) in letting Kazakhstan hold the 2022 Winter Olympics while not ruling out the possibility of dropping Olympic bid, calling the IOC's demands "unfounded", asserting that the Kazakh society is against same-sex marriage and that the Communist People's Party of Kazakhstan (QKHP) would "unequivocally oppose it."

Following the 2016 shooting of Almaty police officers which sparked debate on capital punishment, Qongyrov stressed that if a moratorium on death penalty in Kazakhstan is lifted, it would lead to "a serious blow to the image" to the country, suggesting that Kazakhstan's desire in being in top 30 list of countries in the OECD would be problematic as Qongyrov noted that member countries within the organisation have no capital punishment in place.

References

1972 births
Living people
People from Akmola Region
Communist Party of Kazakhstan politicians
Members of the Mazhilis